Eustictus necopinus is a species of plant bug in the family Miridae. It is found in North America.

Subspecies
These two subspecies belong to the species Eustictus necopinus:
 Eustictus necopinus discretus Knight, 1923
 Eustictus necopinus necopinus Knight, 1923

References

Further reading

 

Articles created by Qbugbot
Insects described in 1923
Deraeocorini